The Guild of St Raphael, founded in 1915, was a Christian organisation dedicated to promoting, supporting and practicing Christ's ministry of healing as an integral part of the life and worship of the Church. Originating from within the Anglican Communion, it expanded to include members from other Churches and became ecumenical in outlook. It was also international in scope with over one hundred branches throughout the world. The Guild took its name from the Book of Tobit, where Saint Raphael is the angel who helps Tobias find his way. The Guild stated it was: "the Anglican means of teaching the arts and sciences of the ministry of healing by prayer, sacraments and by full co-operation with the medical profession".

In October 2015 the Guild merged with the Guild of Health - from which it had originally emerged - under the formal title of The Guild of Health and St. Raphael. The remainder of this article contains the text as it appeared before the merger.
Information about membership and the publications Guild News and Chrism can now be found at www.gohealth.org.uk

Origins and history

Some Internet sources place the founding of the Guild by some of the members of the Stella Matutina, including Robert Felkin. There is little documentary evidence available to support this assertion outside of the book by Francis X. King, (1989), and he asserts that the Guild rapidly became completely separate from any of the practices of Stella Matutina. The available evidence suggests it never was connected.

Recent minutes (published in Chrism, 2006) show that the driving personalities behind the foundation of the Guild in 1915 were a Miss Caroline Biggs, recorded as Secretary of the newly formed Guild, with the Reverend Canon R. P. Roseveare of St Paul's Deptford, recorded as its first Warden.

By 1920, under Canon Roseveare's Wardenship, the fourth Annual Report gives the membership as 19 priest members, 26 priest associates, 2 lay members and 248 lay associates. The Guild had already penetrated into Africa, Canada, New Zealand, India and China.

A letter to the Times, published in 1933 by Bishop W. W. Hough, Warden of the Guild, notes that "The movement has grown. There are now over 2,000 lay members, and 300 priest members who are practicing spiritual healing in most of the dioceses in the land."

Works
Its main emphasis is on the actual practice of the healing ministry through its local branches, and this is where its strength lies. Its members observe a simple rule of prayer, study and work for this ministry. Their aim is always to promote Christ's ministry of healing - looking not just for physical healing, but for the healing of the whole person.

The Guild looks too for the healing of communities and of God's creation itself - taking into account those many social and political factors which cause 'dis-ease' in our broken and divided world.

Prayer for healing is at the heart of the Guild's work, as are the sacraments of healing - anointing and the sacramental act of the laying on of hands. But members make use of other healing actions as well - the ministry of listening and silence, counselling, informal liturgies and simple symbolic actions. The Guild has in the past gained a high-profile for its study and recognition of exorcism. In 1960, the Rev. Henry Cooper, Chaplain to the Guild, argued that successful exorcists are people who know something about psychiatry and work well with doctors. They resort to bell, book and candle only when psychiatrists have given up. A Henry Cooper Lecture is given each year in Cooper's memory.

The Guild also engages in extensive theological education and research. In particular through its periodical, Chrism, mentioned below.

In this and in all its activities the Guild has always stood for the closest co-operation with members of the medical profession and others engaged in the work of healing.

Periodical

The Guild publishes a half-yearly periodical, Chrism, in which it endeavours to explore different aspects of the healing scene. Past editions have dealt with diverse topics such as Children and Healing, Touch in a Fearful Society, Animals and Healing, A Theology of Health for Today, M.E. (Chronic Fatigue Syndrome), Dementia, Genetic Engineering and Healing, Alcohol and Substance Abuse.

Wardens 

1915 Reverend Canon R. P. Roseveare of St Paul's Deptford
1920s/1930s Right Reverend W. W. Hough, Bishop of Woolwich 
1940s Reverend T. W. Crafter
1959 Reverend F. S. Sinker, Vicar of Offchurch, Diocese of Coventry
1980s Right Reverend Cecil Richard Rutt, Bishop of Leicester

Bibliography 
Guild of St. Raphael: "The Ministry of Healing". Booklet, 2005
Henry Cooper, Deliverance and Healing: The Place of Exorcism in the Healing Ministry, London: Guild of Health and Guild of St. Raphael, 1972
The Priest's Vade Mecum. A Manual for the Visiting of the Sick, 1945, edited by Guild Warden Rev. T. W. Crafter, put forth by the Literature Committee of the Guild of St Raphael.
Christian Healing: History and Hope; by Mary Theresa Webb, 2002
Psychology and Life; by Leslie D. Weatherhead, 1935
Guild News, March 2006

References

External links
Guild Website
Guild Website, St Brelade, Jersey
A fresh look at a remarkable document: Exorcism: The report of a commission convened by the Bishop of Exeter
The Bishop's Advisory Group on the Church's Ministry of Healing, Bristol
Book review on Chrism Autumn 2002 number on Dementia

History of Christianity in England
Christian organizations established in 1915
Anglican organizations established in the 20th century